Povilas Vitonis was a Lithuanian weightlifter.

Vitonis competed at the 1928 Summer Olympics in Amsterdam, Netherlands, he entered the men's middleweight contest, and successfully lifted 85kg in the Press, another 85kg in the snatch and 105kg in the clean & jerk, giving him a total of 275kg and finished in 15th place.

References

Lithuanian male weightlifters
Olympic weightlifters of Lithuania
Weightlifters at the 1928 Summer Olympics
Year of birth missing
Year of death missing